Ivan Fears (born November 15, 1954) is a retired American football coach who is the former running backs coach for the New England Patriots of the National Football League (NFL).

Playing career

High school
Fears attended John Yeates High School in Suffolk, Virginia, and was a letterman in football. In football, he was twice named the school's "Outstanding Player of the Year", and as a senior, was also an All-State selection.  He attended The College of William & Mary, where he played football as a running back from 1973 to 1975.

Coaching career

College
Fears began his coaching career in 1976 with his alma mater, William & Mary as a graduate assistant and in 1977-1978 was the team's Receivers coach.

NFL
Fears joined the Patriots' coaching staff in 1991. He spent two seasons with the Patriots before moving on to coach the Chicago Bears' wide receivers starting in 1993, but rejoined the New England coaching staff in 1999 as their wide receivers coach. In 2002, he was reassigned to running backs coach. Fears won six Super Bowls as an integral part of both dynasties with the Patriots. He announced his retirement in 2022.

References

External links
New England Patriots bio

1954 births
Living people
Sportspeople from Portsmouth, Virginia
American football running backs
William & Mary Tribe football players
William & Mary Tribe football coaches
Syracuse Orange football coaches
New England Patriots coaches
Chicago Bears coaches
Players of American football from Virginia
African-American coaches of American football